The Bantam was a British cyclecar manufactured by Slack and Harrison in Kegworth, Leicestershire in 1913.

It was powered by an 8-horsepower V-twin engine made by Precision.  There was no gearbox and variation in transmission ratios was provided for by variable pulleys. Final drive was by chain.

See also
 List of car manufacturers of the United Kingdom

References

Vintage vehicles
Cyclecars
Defunct motor vehicle manufacturers of England
Vehicle manufacturing companies established in 1913